The Far Side Gallery 4 is the fourth anthology of Gary Larson's The Far Side comic strips. Cartoons from previous collections Wiener Dog Art, Unnatural Selections, and Wildlife Preserves are featured, all of which were printed from 1990 to 1992, featuring more than 20 full-color pages. The foreword was written by Robin Williams.

1993 books
The Far Side